Salmo ezenami is a critically endangered freshwater salmonid fish, endemic to Lake Kezenoi-Am (Lake Eizenam) in Northern Caucasus.

The only native occurrence, in Lake Kezenoi-Am in Chechnya at the border of Dagestan, is in a cold alpine lake (area 2.4 km2, maximum depth 74 m, 1870 m altitude). In addition, the species has been introduced to another lake in Dagestan, Lake Mochokh, probably successfully.

Salmo ezenami used to be the only fish species in Lake Kezenoi-Am. However, two other species, the European chub and Caspian gudgeon have been introduced, and present a threat by eating the fry of Salmo.

Salmo ezenami spawns in the lake, close to underwater springs. Adult fish also probably migrate to tributaries. There are separate small-sized (adults 160–260 mm) and large-sized forms (380–1130 mm). Young prey on gammarids and chironomids; adults also eat molluscs and fishes, after the introduction of nonnative species.

References

ezenami
Taxa named by Lev Berg
Fish described in 1948
Endemic fauna of Russia